Gary August Fenner (born 1947) is a senior United States district judge of the United States District Court for the Western District of Missouri.

Education and career

Born in St. Joseph, Missouri, Fenner received a Bachelor of Arts degree from the University of Kansas in Lawrence, Kansas in 1970 and a Juris Doctor from the University of Missouri-Kansas City School of Law in 1973. He was in private practice in Platte City, Missouri in 1973. He was an assistant city attorney of City of St. Joseph from 1973 to 1977. He was a business law instructor, Webster College from 1976 to 1977. He was in private practice in St. Joseph, Missouri from 1977 to 1979. He was a Circuit judge on the Fifth Judicial Circuit Court of Missouri from 1979 to 1987. He was a judge on the Missouri Court of Appeals, Western District from 1988 to 1996, serving as chief judge from 1994 to 1996.

Federal judicial service

Fenner was nominated by President Bill Clinton on December 13, 1995, to be a United States District Judge of the United States District Court for the Western District of Missouri, to a seat vacated by Scott Olin Wright. He was confirmed by the United States Senate on July 10, 1996, and received his commission on July 25, 1996. He assumed senior status on September 8, 2015.

External links 

1947 births
Living people
Missouri Court of Appeals judges
Missouri state court judges
University of Kansas alumni
University of Missouri–Kansas City alumni
Judges of the United States District Court for the Western District of Missouri
United States district court judges appointed by Bill Clinton
Politicians from St. Joseph, Missouri
People from St. Joseph, Missouri
20th-century American judges
21st-century American judges